Olaf Helset (28 July 1892 – 21 August 1960) was a Norwegian military officer with the rank of Major General, and a sports administrator. He played a central role in the early resistance during the German occupation of Norway, both civil and military resistance. He was later in command of the Norwegian police troops in exile in Sweden. After the war he served as head of the Norwegian Army for two years.

Personal life 
Helset was born in Nannestad, as the son of Peder Helset and Ingeborg Kristiane Skjegstad. He grew up in Romerike. He married Nini Eugenie Hansen in 1920.

Early career
Helset graduated from the Norwegian Military Academy in 1915, from the State Gymnastics School in 1917, and from the Norwegian Military College in 1919.
 
He chaired the sports club IL i BUL in 1917, 1920–1922, 1923–1924, 1925–1926 and 1927.

World War II 
During the Norwegian Campaign in 1940 Helset was in command at the Battle of Midtskogen. As a sports leader he fronted the sports boycott against the Nazi authorities. He was also a leader in the military organization Milorg, the main Norwegian resistance movement during the Occupation of Norway by Nazi Germany. Helset was arrested in 1941, but eventually released from prison and fled to Sweden. There, he worked first as a refugee chief in 1943–44 and then in 1944–45 as head of the Norwegian police forces in Sweden.

For his war efforts, he was decorated with the Norwegian War Cross with Sword (1949), Finnish Freedom Cross in gold, the British King's Medal for Courage in the Cause of Freedom and other foreign decorations.

Later career 
Helset served as Head of the Norwegian Army from 1946 to 1948, when he resigned after a conflict with the government on defense policy. After his resignation he served as head of the district of Southern Norway, with the rank of Major General. He served as commander of the Fredriksten fortress from 1951 to 1953. He was a leader of the Norwegian Confederation of Sports from 1946 to 1948. In 1947 he was decorated Commander with Star of the Order of St. Olav. He was a Commander of the French Légion d'honneur and Commander of the Swedish Order of the Sword.

References

External links

1892 births
1960 deaths
People from Nannestad
Norwegian Military Academy alumni
Norwegian School of Sport Sciences alumni
Norwegian Military College alumni
Norwegian Army personnel of World War II
Norwegian prisoners of war in World War II
World War II prisoners of war held by Germany
Norwegian Army generals
Norwegian resistance members
Norwegian sports executives and administrators
Presidents of the Organising Committees for the Olympic Games
Commandeurs of the Légion d'honneur
Recipients of the Order of the Sword
Recipients of the War Cross with Sword (Norway)
Recipients of the Order of the Cross of Liberty
Recipients of the King's Medal for Courage in the Cause of Freedom